Arthur Clark Ball (April 1876 – December 26, 1915) was an American Major League Baseball player from Kentucky.  Ball played parts of two seasons in the Majors; one game for the 1894 St. Louis Browns, and 32 games for the 1898 Baltimore Orioles.

After his professional baseball career ended after 1913, he moved to Chicago, where he was a nightwatchman.  Ball died at the age of 39 in Chicago of liver cirrhosis and peritonitis with pulmonary tuberculosis, and is interred at Mount Olivet Cemetery.

References

External links

1876 births
1915 deaths
Major League Baseball infielders
St. Louis Browns (NL) players
Baltimore Orioles (NL) players
Baseball players from Kentucky
Deaths from cirrhosis
20th-century deaths from tuberculosis
19th-century baseball players
Memphis Giants players
Fort Wayne (minor league baseball) players
Minneapolis Millers (baseball) players
Rock Island-Moline Islanders players
St. Paul Apostles players
St. Paul Saints (Western League) players
Des Moines Hawkeyes players
St. Joseph Saints players
Peoria Distillers players
Duluth White Sox players
Tuberculosis deaths in Illinois